The 1986 FIFA World Cup was the 13th FIFA World Cup, a quadrennial football tournament for men's senior national teams. It was played in Mexico from 31 May to 29 June 1986. The tournament was the second to feature a 24-team format. Colombia had been originally chosen to host the competition by FIFA but, largely due to economic reasons, was not able to do so, and resigned in 1982. Mexico was selected as the new host in May 1983, and became the first country to host the World Cup more than once, after previously hosting in 1970.

The World Cup was won by Argentina (their second title, after winning in 1978). Argentina was captained by the 25-year-old Diego Maradona, who played a large part in his team's success by scoring his "Hand of God" goal, as well as another voted "Goal of the Century", in the same quarter-final against England. These were two of the five goals that Maradona scored during the tournament, and he also created another five for his teammates. Argentina beat West Germany 3–2 in the final at Mexico City's Estadio Azteca. Total attendance was 2,394,031, an average per match of 46,039. Canada, Denmark and Iraq made their first appearances at the final stage.

The format of the competition changed from 1982. The final pair of matches in each group started at the same time and the second round was played on a knock-out basis rather than groups. The 24 teams qualified were divided into six groups of four (A to F). The top two teams and the four best third-place finishers from the six groups advanced to the knockout round of 16 teams.
Italy were the defending champions, but were eliminated by France in the Round of 16.

The tournament saw the appearance of the Mexican wave, a spectator phenomenon which was popularised worldwide after featuring during the tournament.

Host selection

Colombia was originally chosen as hosts by FIFA in June 1974, with Bogotá, Medellín, Cali, Pereira and Bucaramanga intended as the host cities, plus potentially Barranquilla. Colombia agreed to host a 16-team competition, however, FIFA later allowed an expansion to 24 teams for the 1982 World Cup in Spain, which was more challenging for Colombia to host, although FIFA President João Havelange initially gave assurances that they could revert to a 16-team tournament. Colombian president Julio César Turbay Ayala was initially against holding the tournament in his country, but reluctantly granted permission in October 1980. Eventually, the Colombians declared on 5 November 1982 that they could not afford to host the World Cup under the terms that FIFA demanded.

Although Mexico, United States and Canada submitted bids on 11 March 1983 to be the replacement host, the five-person special FIFA committee responsible for recommending the bids to the Executive Committee (Exco) announced on 31 March that it would only consider Mexico's bid, saying the United States and Canada had "deviated" from FIFA's criteria and Exco members refused to visit Canadian and American stadium sites. On 20 May, the committee announced Mexico as the replacement hosts despite Havelange stating that the United States and Canada had made better presentations. Mexico became the first nation to host two World Cups, as it had hosted the 1970 FIFA World Cup.

The Canadian representatives criticised the committee's decision to not consider Canada, saying they had submitted a more complete bid than Mexico, and that they had been misled by the number of stadiums required for bidding. The United States' bid contained more than the required number of stadiums with the required capacity to host World Cup matches (at least 40,000 capacity, 60,000 for second-round matches and 80,000 for the tournament final). Mexico submitted a bid with 14 stadiums, only six of which seated over 40,000 at the time of the bid, and three over 60,000. Havelange in turn criticised the United States' handling of stadium selection for the football tournament at the 1984 Summer Olympics in Los Angeles. The Americans also pointed out that Mexico had the influence of two seats on the 22-person executive committee, a FIFA vice president and an executive at Televisa, a Mexican television network with ties to Havelange. Also working in Mexico's favour was Havelange secretly promising the broadcast rights to Televisa ahead of the vote. Following the bidding process, Henry Kissinger, the former United States Secretary of State who led the United States bid committee, remarked, "The politics of soccer make me nostalgic for the politics of the Middle East," while the leader of the Canadian committee called Mexico's 10-page bid document "a joke."

A severe earthquake in September 1985, eight months before the tournament, cast doubt over Mexico's ability to organise the event, but the stadiums were not affected and it was decided to go ahead with the preparations. As 1986 had been declared the International Year of Peace by the United Nations, the advertising boards of all the stadia displayed the FIFA and United Nations logos along with the legend "Football for Peace – Peace Year".

For the design of the logo an unofficial motto was adopted: "El Mundo Unido por Un Balón" ("The World United by a Ball").

The official match ball was the Adidas Azteca.

Mascot

The official mascot of the 1986 World Cup was Pique, a jalapeño pepper, characteristic of Mexican cuisine, with a moustache, a Colimote sombrero, and Mexican football team colours. Its name comes from picante, a Spanish word meaning "spicy", and was also a pun on the "PK" abbreviation of the football term penalty kick. Pique is also a common Spanish name.

The character caused a degree of controversy within Mexico for its ethnic stereotypes.

Qualification

Three teams qualified for the World Cup for the first time: Canada, Denmark and Iraq. Canada clinched its spot after winning the final match against Honduras 2–1 in St. John's, Newfoundland. Iraq played all their home matches on neutral ground because of the Iran–Iraq War. South Korea qualified for the first time since 1954, Paraguay for the first time since 1958, Portugal for the first time since 1966 and Bulgaria and Uruguay for the first time since 1974. , this was the last time that Hungary and Northern Ireland qualified for the finals, and the only time that Iraq have qualified.

List of qualified teams

The following 24 teams qualified for the final tournament.

AFC (2)
 
 
CAF (2)
 
 
OFC (0)
 None qualified

CONCACAF (2)
 
  (hosts)
CONMEBOL (4)
 
 
 
 

UEFA (14)
 
 
 
 
 
 
  (defending champions)

Venues
Eleven cities hosted the tournament. The Azteca Stadium in Mexico City, the largest stadium used for the tournament, hosted nine matches (including the final), more than any other stadium used. Mexico City hosted 13 total matches; the Olimpico Universitario Stadium hosted four matches (if the Mexico City suburban town Nezahualcoyotl's three matches are included, this brings the total up to 16 matches; nearly a third of all matches in this tournament). Guadalajara, Mexico's second largest city hosted 10 total matches (the Jalisco Stadium hosted seven matches, the Tres de Marzo Stadium in Zapopan hosted three), Monterrey hosted eight matches (The Tecnologico Stadium and the Universitario Stadium in San Nicolas de los Garza hosted four matches each), and the Cuauhtémoc Stadium in Puebla hosted five matches.

The hot, humid and rainy summer weather in Mexico varied from humid desert locations like Monterrey to tropical locations such as Guadalajara; but perhaps the greatest hardship the players had to contend with was the high altitude of the Mexican locations.

All of these venues except Monterrey were located in central Mexico, as this tournament was organized with the then-standard way of keeping teams playing in locations in close proximity to each other. Group A only played at the Olimpico and in Puebla (except for the Bulgaria-Italy opening tournament match, which was played in the Azteca), Group B only played at the Azteca and in Toluca (hosts Mexico were part of this group; they played all their group stage matches at the Azteca), Group C played in León and Irapuato, Group D only played in Guadalajara (including the Guadalajara area town of Zapopan; the last match of this group was played in Monterrey), Group E exclusively played in Querétaro and Nezahualcóyotl, and Group F played in the northern city of Monterrey (including the Monterrey area town of San Nicolas de los Garza; the last match of this group was played in Guadalajara). All of the venues listed hosted knockout round matches except the ones in Nezahualcoyotl, Irapuato, Zapopan, Toluca and the Estadio Tecnologico in Monterrey.

 Morocco and Portugal played in Guadalajara while Spain and Algeria played in Monterrey.

Match officials

Africa
  Ali Ben Nasser
  Edwin Picon-Ackong
  Idrissa Traoré

Asia
  Fallaj Al-Shanar
  Jamal Al Sharif
  Shizuo Takada

Europe
  Luigi Agnolin
  Horst Brummeier
  Valeri Butenko
  Vojtech Christov
  George Courtney

  André Daina
  Bogdan Dotchev
  Erik Fredriksson
  Ioan Igna
  Jan Keizer
  Siegfried Kirschen
  Lajos Németh
  Zoran Petrović
  Alexis Ponnet
  Joël Quiniou
  Volker Roth
  Victoriano Sánchez Arminio
  Carlos Silva Valente
  Alan Snoddy

North and Central America
  Rómulo Méndez
  Antonio Márquez Ramírez
  David Socha
  Berny Ulloa Morera

Oceania
  Chris Bambridge

South America
  Romualdo Arppi Filho
  Jesús Díaz
  Carlos Espósito
  Gabriel González Roa
  José Luis Martínez Bazán
  Hernán Silva

Squads
For a list of all squads that appeared in the final tournament, see 1986 FIFA World Cup squads.

Seeding

Summary

First round

The first round of the finals began in Group A, where Italy were held 1–1 by Bulgaria. Meanwhile, Argentina beat South Korea 3–1, with Diego Maradona playing a major part. Italy and Argentina drew 1–1, Maradona and Alessandro Altobelli scoring. South Korea and Bulgaria also drew 1–1 in a downpour. The final set of matches saw Argentina beating Bulgaria 2–0, and Italy narrowly defeating South Korea 3–2.

In Group B Mexico beat Belgium 2–1, and despite being held 1–1 by Paraguay, they won the group after a further win over Iraq, 1–0. Paraguay and Belgium also progressed after both beating Iraq and drawing with each other.

Group C pitted a strong Dynamo Kyiv-dominated Soviet Union side against the reigning European champions France. They drew with each other 1–1, with a goal scored by Vasyl Rats. France beat Canada 1–0 and finished in 2nd place in the group after beating Hungary, 3–0. Hungary had earlier lost 6–0 against the Soviet Union, which won the group due to goal difference.

Group D saw Brazil start against Spain, winning 1–0 after the referee failed to validate a legal goal scored by Míchel. Northern Ireland began their campaign with a draw against Algeria. Northern Ireland were then narrowly beaten by Spain before losing to Brazil 3–0 in their final match. This match saw a goal from Josimar on his debut and was also the final time Pat Jennings played for Northern Ireland. Spain qualified along with Brazil after defeating Algeria 3–0.

Denmark stormed through Group E, dubbed the group of death, with a 100 per cent record. They beat Alex Ferguson's Scotland 1–0 in their first game, then hammered Uruguay 6–1, with Preben Elkjær hitting a hat-trick. Denmark beat one of the favourites to win the tournament, West Germany, 2–0 thanks to a Jesper Olsen penalty and a goal from John Eriksen. After losing to Denmark, Scotland took the lead against West Germany thanks to a Gordon Strachan goal, but the West Germans fought back to win 2–1. After a violent 0–0 draw against Uruguay, the Scots were eliminated from the tournament. During that game José Batista of Uruguay was sent off after less than one minute of play for a foul on Strachan, a World Cup record that still stands. West Germany went through to the second round despite a loss against Denmark.

Morocco topped Group F after holding both Poland and England to goalless draws, and beating Portugal 3–1. By doing so, they became the first African team, and only the second nation from outside Europe and the Americas (after North Korea in 1966), to reach the second round. England lost 1–0 to Portugal, followed by a 0–0 draw against Morocco in which they lost captain Bryan Robson to injury (for the remainder of the tournament) and vice-captain Ray Wilkins to a red card (he was not selected for the remainder of the tournament, even after having served his obligatory one-match ban). In their last first-round game, with the captaincy taken over by Peter Shilton in goal, a first-half Gary Lineker hat-trick helped the reshaped side beat Poland 3–0 – although losing yet another player to a ban for the next round, Terry Fenwick receiving his second booking of the tournament. Poland had previously beaten Portugal, and in the end the Portuguese were the only team from Group F to be eliminated in the first round. Portugal, making their first appearance in 20 years, went on strike (in the Saltillo Affair) during the competition. Players refused to train between their first and second games (against England and Poland) and were eliminated after a loss to Morocco in the final group match.

Second round and quarter-finals
Belgium beat the Soviet Union 4–3, despite a hat-trick by the Soviets' Igor Belanov. The game was level at 2–2 after 90 minutes, and in extra time Stephane Demol and Nico Claesen put Belgium 4–2 up. Belanov scored from the penalty spot with nine minutes remaining, but neither he nor any of his teammates could find a fourth goal for the Soviet Union. At the Olympic University Stadium in Mexico City, the European champions France ended Italy's reign as world champions with a 2–0 victory thanks to goals from Michel Platini and Yannick Stopyra. In the rematch of the 1930 FIFA World Cup Final, Argentina just edged out South American champions Uruguay in Puebla thanks to a 42nd-minute strike from Pedro Pasculli. The all-South American affair had a Diego Maradona's goal disallowed.

In Querétaro, Denmark were eliminated as they went from a 1–0 lead to a 5–1 battering against Spain; key player Frank Arnesen was suspended for the game after being sent off against West Germany in their last group match, for taking a swipe at German playmaker Lothar Matthäus. The Danes scored first, with a Jesper Olsen penalty, but they were then taken apart by a devastating performance from Butragueño of Spain, who scored four of his team's five goals. At the Azteca Stadium in Mexico City, England progressed to the quarter-finals comfortably when they saw off Paraguay 3–0, while Brazil brushed aside Poland 4–0. West Germany had a much harder time getting past Morocco, for whom goalkeeper Badou Zaki had an outstanding game. Morocco held out until the 87th minute, when Lothar Matthäus scored the only goal of the match with a free kick. Mexico won 2–0 against Bulgaria with an outstanding scissor-kick goal by Manuel Negrete which is honored by a remembrance plaque at the Azteca.

In the quarter-finals, France faced three-time world champion Brazil in Guadalajara. Brazil were well on top in the early stages, and Careca put them one up after 18 minutes. Five minutes before half-time, France drew level when Michel Platini scored his 41st goal after converting a cross from Dominique Rocheteau. Brazil had a chance to regain the lead in the second half when Branco was fouled by French keeper Joël Bats in the penalty area. Zico got up to take the kick, but Bats saved Zico's penalty.

The match went to extra time, and France finished slightly the stronger of the two sides. No more goals were scored, and so it was time for a penalty shoot-out. Socrates, who had earlier missed an open goal and headed an easy chance straight into the French keeper's arms, failed with the first kick for Brazil. The next six penalties were all converted, and then Platini fired over the bar. Brazil were back on level terms – but not for long. Julio Cesar struck the post with his penalty, and Luis Fernández then scored to put France through 4–3 on penalties.

Two other quarter-finals were also decided on penalties. Jan Ceulemans put Belgium ahead against Spain in the 35th minute, but Spanish substitute Señor equalised with five minutes to go. No more goals were scored in extra time, and Belgium won the shoot-out 5–4. On the hosts' first game outside of the Azteca, Francisco Javier Cruz saw a goal disallowed as West Germany and Mexico drew 0–0 after extra time. The West Germans eliminated the hosts 4–1 on penalties. As a curiosity, the German goalkeeper Harald Schumacher jumped to the right in the three Mexican penalties (stopping two of them).

The quarter-final between Argentina and England at the Azteca featured two very different goals in the second half by Diego Maradona: the first was scored illegally, as he punched the ball into the goal past England goalkeeper Peter Shilton. The referee did not see the handball and the goal was given as valid. After the game, Maradona claimed the goal was scored "A bit with the head of Maradona and another bit with the hand of God"; it became known as the "Hand of God" goal. For his second goal, voted "Goal of the Century" in 2002 on the FIFA website, Maradona dribbled half the length of the field past five English players before scoring. With 20 minutes to go, the introduction of John Barnes as a substitute changed the tide of play in England's favour, as he pinged cross after cross into the Argentine penalty area: with 9 minutes to go, Lineker got on the end of one and scored, then almost repeated the dose six minutes later but was just unable to reach the ball thanks to a timely block by Olarticoechea: 2–1 to Argentina was the final score. In Argentina, the game was seen as revenge for the Falklands War.

Semi-finals, third-place match and final
In the first semi-final match, Andreas Brehme put West Germany 1–0 ahead against France in the ninth minute in Guadalajara, but the outcome remained in doubt until two minutes from time when Rudi Völler made it 2–0, and West Germany were in the final for the second World Cup in succession. In the second semi-final match, Maradona struck twice in the second half as Argentina beat Belgium 2–0 at the Azteca. France went on to defeat Belgium in the third-place match, 4–2.

So it was to be the South American Argentina vs the European West Germany at the final at the Azteca, the second time this massive stadium would host a World Cup Final (the first in 1970). Jose Brown put Argentina one up midway through the first half of the final, and when Jorge Valdano scored a second for the South Americans in the 55th minute, Argentina looked to be strolling to victory. West Germany then staged a spirited comeback. Karl-Heinz Rummenigge pulled one back in the 74th minute, and six minutes later Rudi Völler hit the equaliser. With seven minutes remaining, a pass from Maradona gave Jorge Burruchaga the chance to score the winner for Argentina. Eight years on from their home triumph, Argentina regained the world title and 30 million people in Argentina celebrated in the streets after the final victory. Maradona was the Golden Ball winner as the best player of the tournament, while Gary Lineker of England won the Golden Boot as the leading scorer of the World Cup with six goals.

Group stage
All times are Central Time (UTC−6)

Group A

Group B

Group C

Group D

Group E

Group F

Ranking of third-placed teams

Knockout stage
Argentina beat West Germany for the first time and won their second World Cup. Belgium finished in fourth place, their best finish in the World Cup until 2018, where they finished third.

Round of 16

Quarter-finals

Semi-finals

Third place play-off

Final

Awards
Source:

Goalscorers
Gary Lineker received the Golden Boot for scoring six goals. In total, 132 goals were scored by 82 players, with two of them credited as own goals.

6 goals
  Gary Lineker

5 goals
  Diego Maradona
  Careca
  Emilio Butragueño

4 goals
  Jorge Valdano
  Preben Elkjær
  Alessandro Altobelli
  Igor Belanov

3 goals
  Jan Ceulemans
  Nico Claesen
  Jesper Olsen
  Rudi Völler

2 goals

  Jorge Burruchaga
  Enzo Scifo
  Josimar
  Sócrates
  Jean-Pierre Papin
  Michel Platini
  Yannick Stopyra
  Fernando Quirarte
  Abderrazak Khairi
  Roberto Cabañas
  Julio César Romero
  Ramón Calderé
  Klaus Allofs

1 goal

  Djamel Zidane
  José Luis Brown
  Pedro Pasculli
  Oscar Ruggeri
  Stéphane Demol
  Erwin Vandenbergh
  Franky Vercauteren
  Daniel Veyt
  Edinho
  Plamen Getov
  Nasko Sirakov
  John Eriksen
  Michael Laudrup
  Søren Lerby
  Peter Beardsley
  Manuel Amoros
  Luis Fernández
  Jean-Marc Ferreri
  Bernard Genghini
  Dominique Rocheteau
  Jean Tigana
  Lajos Détári
  Márton Esterházy
  Ahmed Radhi
  Luis Flores
  Manuel Negrete
  Hugo Sánchez
  Raúl Servín
  Abdelkrim Merry
  Colin Clarke
  Norman Whiteside
  Włodzimierz Smolarek
  Carlos Manuel
  Diamantino
  Gordon Strachan
  Choi Soon-ho
  Huh Jung-moo
  Kim Jong-boo
  Park Chang-sun
  Sergei Aleinikov
  Oleh Blokhin
  Vasyl Rats
  Sergey Rodionov
  Pavlo Yakovenko
  Ivan Yaremchuk
  Oleksandr Zavarov
  Eloy
  Andoni Goikoetxea
  Julio Salinas
  Juan Antonio Señor
  Antonio Alzamendi
  Enzo Francescoli
  Andreas Brehme
  Lothar Matthäus
  Karl-Heinz Rummenigge

Own goals
  László Dajka (against the Soviet Union)
  Cho Kwang-rae (against Italy)

Red cards
Eight players received a red card during the tournament:
  Mike Sweeney
  Frank Arnesen
  Ray Wilkins
  Thomas Berthold
  Basil Gorgis
  Javier Aguirre
  José Batista
  Miguel Bossio

FIFA retrospective ranking
In 1986, FIFA published a report that ranked all teams in each World Cup up to and including 1986, based on progress in the competition, overall results and quality of the opposition. The rankings for the 1986 tournament were as follows:

References

External links

 1986 FIFA World Cup Mexico, FIFA.com
 1986 World Cup Details RSSSF
 FIFA Technical Report (Part 1), (Part 2), (Part 3) and (Part 4)

 
1985–86 in Mexican football
World Cup
May 1986 sports events in North America
June 1986 sports events in North America
May 1986 events in Mexico
June 1986 events in Mexico
FIFA World Cup tournaments
International association football competitions hosted by Mexico